Trust Bank Limited is a private commercial bank established in 1999 in Bangladesh. It is backed by Army Welfare Trust of Bangladesh Army. General SM Shafiuddin Ahmed the chief of Bangladesh army is its chairman. It is one of the leading private commercial banks having a network of 114 branches, 7 SME Service Centers, 244 ATM Booths and 140 POS in 114 Branches across Bangladesh.

History 
In 1999, the Bangladesh Army Welfare Trust established Trust bank limited.

In 2001, the bank introduced automated branch banking system. In 2005, the bank introduced ATM services for its customers.

In January 2007, Trust Bank launched online banking services. Customers can now deposit or withdraw money from any branch of Trust Bank nationwide without needing to open multiple accounts in multiple branches. In November 2008, Trust Bank denied allegations by Mahmudur Rahman that its former chairman, Hasan Mashhud Chowdhury, was involved with laundering money from the bank in 2002. Trust Bank announced 10 per cent dividends in 2008 at the 9th annual general meeting of the bank.

The Bank opened a merchant banking wing in 2009.

In 2020, the consolidated net profit for the bank was 650 million taka.

On 2 August 2022, Trust Bank held its the 23rd Annual General Meeting online chaired by the vice-chairman of the bank, Major General Md Moshfequr Rahman. The meeting approved a 22.5 dividend for the year. The bank signed an agreement with Bengal Commercial Bank Limited to facilitate money transfer through Ria Money Transfer. Trust Axiata Pay, also known as TAP, is a money transfer service owned by Trust Bank Limited. TAP has an agreement with Canteen Stores Department for processing payment.

References

External links

 Official website
 Internet Banking Service

Banks of Bangladesh
Banks established in 1999
Banks of Bangladesh with Islamic banking services
1999 establishments in Bangladesh